Nowcasting or Nowcast may refer to:

 Nowcasting (economics), the estimate of the current state of the economy
 Nowcasting (meteorology), the weather forecasting for a short period of up to a few hours
 3D nowcasting, the prediction of precipitation several minutes before it occurs
NowCast (air quality index), the real time estimate of the air quality as well as the few hours prediction of ozone concentration